Füzesd is the Hungarian name for two villages in Romania:

 Fizeş village, Băiţa Commune, Hunedoara County
 Fizeşti village, Pui Commune, Hunedoara County